Futurewise may refer to:

Futurewise (book), a 2007 book by Patrick Dixon
Futurewise.org, a Washington State growth management organization